female:pressure is an international network of female, transgender and non-binary artists in the fields of electronic music and digital arts founded by Electric Indigo in 1998 : from musicians, composers and DJs to visual artists, cultural workers and researchers. A worldwide resource of talent that can be searched after criteria like location, profession, style or name. "Why are there so few women active in the electronic music scene?" - each one of us has heard this question a thousand times... Here is the answer: It's not our number, it's about how and if we are recognized!

It was founded as an information resource and network for improving communication and representation of its members. It is notable for raising the profile of women and their work, including through festivals and media campaigns.

Since 2013, female:pressure biennially publishes the Facts Survey, a data ascertainment to survey the gender ratio of artists performing at important international electronic music festivals and in the electronic music scene.

Link 
Website

References 
 List of female electronic musicians

Feminist artists
Electronic music organizations
Digital art